Nissan Variable Timing control or Nissan Valve Timing Control System (commonly known as N-VTC, VTC, NVCS or NVTCS) is an automobile variable valve timing technology developed by Nissan. N-VTC was first introduced in 1987 on the VG30DE and VG20DET engine.

N-VTC varies valve timing by rotating the affected camshaft relative to the sprocket; valve lift and duration are not altered. This rotation is achieved when an electric solenoid, controlled by the car's ECU, allows pressurized engine oil to flow into and through the cam and into a slave mechanism, axially advancing camshaft timing relative to the sprocket. Valve to crank angle timing varies depending on whether engine speed is high or low and changes at fixed intervals. NVTCS is hydraulically actuated similar to Honda's VTEC system, but adjusts a different aspect of the valve train, so it is more like the I part of I-VTEC. NVTCS equipped Nissan engines do not have as high of engine speeds as VTEC equipped engines so NVTCS is simpler, quieter, and requires no special maintenance. Some Nissan engines only have N-VTC on the intake cam such as the GA16DE, QG16/18, SR20DE/DET (S14-15) or RB25DE/DET (R33-R34 GTS/GTS-T, GT/GTT) while others have it on both the intake and exhaust cams. NVTCS was eventually phased out and replaced by a continuously variable system called CVTCS on newer engines such as the VQ and VK series.

List of engines 
 GA16DE
 QG16DE
 QG18DE
 RB25DET(1993+) (intake only)
 SR20DE
 SR20DET
 TB48DE
 VE30DE
 VG20DET
 VG30DE
 VG30DET
 VG30DETT
 VH45DE

See also 
 Nissan Continuous Variable Valve Timing Control
 Nissan Variable Valve Event and Lift
 Nissan Variable Valve Lift and Timing

References

Variable valve timing
Nissan